Frank Kerr may refer to:

 Frank John Kerr (1918–2000), Australian astronomer and physicist
 Frank Kerr (cricketer) (1916–1943), New Zealand cricketer and RNZAF pilot
 Frank Kerr (footballer) (1889–1977), Australian rules footballer and Australian Army officer